Ibla quadrivalvis is a species of barnacle in the Iblidae family. The common name for this species is hairy stalked barnacle.

The species was studied by Charles Darwin. He first described that this specie is androdioecious.

They live under rocks, in damp cracks and among colonies of tube worms. They are the only stalked barnacle living permanently on rocky shores of south-eastern Australia.

References

Barnacles